53 may refer to: 
 53 (number)
 one of the years 53 BC, AD 53, 1953, 2053
 FiftyThree, an American privately held technology company that specializes in tools for mobile creation and visual thinking
 53rd Regiment Alabama Cavalry
 53rd Regiment of Foot (disambiguation)
 53rd Division (disambiguation)
 53 (Jacky Terrasson album), 2019
 "Fifty Three", a song by Karma to Burn from the album Arch Stanton, 2014
 Fifth Third Bank